Nikolai Aleksandrovich Krasilnikov (December 18, 1896 – July 11, 1973) was a Soviet microbiologist, bacteriologist and soil scientist.

Tribute 
 Krasilnikovia cinnamomea is a bacterial genus named after him of the family Micromonosporaceae

See also 
 List of soil scientists

References

Bibliography 
 Soil Microorganisms and Higher Plants, 1958

External links 

eBook: Soil Microorganisms and Higher Plants

1896 births
1973 deaths
People from Mosalsky Uyezd
Corresponding Members of the USSR Academy of Sciences
Academic staff of Moscow State University
Stalin Prize winners
Recipients of the Order of Lenin
Recipients of the Order of the Red Banner of Labour
Botanists with author abbreviations
Soviet bacteriologists
Soviet microbiologists
Soviet soil scientists
Soviet mycologists